Doors Open is a 2012 Scottish thriller heist film directed by Marc Evans, starring Douglas Henshall, Stephen Fry, Lenora Crichlow and Kenneth Collard. It is based on the 2008 novel of the same name by Ian Rankin, about a self-made millionaire, an art professor and a banker, who come together to undertake an audacious art heist. The film was commissioned by ITV and produced by Stephen Fry's Sprout Pictures production company. It was officially released on 26 December 2012 in the UK.

Plot
After an evening’s drinking with Professor Gissing (Fry), an art expert, and banker Allan Cruickshank (Collard), self-made millionaire Mike McKenzie (Henshall) and his friends dream up a plot to rip-off one of the most high-profile targets in the country – Edinburgh’s private art collection owned by a national bank.

Cast
 Douglas Henshall as Mike McKenzie
 Stephen Fry as Professor Gissing
 Lenora Crichlow as Laura Stanton
 Kenneth Collard as Allan Cruickshank
 Brian McCardie as Charlie Calloway
 Elliot Cowan as Bruce Cameron
 Philip Whitchurch as The Geordie
 Paul McCole as Glenn
 Rab Affleck as Hate
 Sarah McCardie as Carol
 Bobby Rainsbury as HR Woman
 Ellie O'Brien as Theresa

Production
Filming began on 23 April 2012 in Edinburgh. Parts of the film were also shot on the coast of the Scottish Borders and Garvald, East Lothian, with saleroom scenes shot at Edinburgh auction house, Lyon & Turnbull.

References

External links
 

2012 television films
2012 films
British thriller television films
British crime thriller films
Scottish films
English-language Scottish films
2012 crime thriller films
British heist films
Scottish television films
Films based on British novels
Films directed by Marc Evans
Films shot in Edinburgh
Films shot in East Lothian
Films shot in the Scottish Borders
2010s English-language films
2010s British films